"It Never Entered My Mind" is a show tune from the 1940 Rodgers and Hart musical Higher and Higher, where it was introduced by Shirley Ross.

Notable recordings
Frank Sinatra – Frankly Sentimental (1949) Originally recorded November 5, 1947, In the Wee Small Hours (1955), She Shot Me Down (1981)
Patty Andrews (with Gordon Jenkins and orchestra) (1951)
Julie London – Julie Is Her Name (1955)
Miles Davis – Miles Davis, Volume 3 (Blue Note 1954) & Workin' with the Miles Davis Quintet (Prestige 1956)
Ella Fitzgerald – Ella Fitzgerald Sings the Rodgers & Hart Songbook (1956)
Bud Powell – Bud Powell's Moods (1956)
Coleman Hawkins and Ben Webster – Coleman Hawkins Encounters Ben Webster (1957)
Stan Getz – Stan Getz and J. J. Johnson at the Opera House (1957)
Jeri Southern – Southern Hospitality (1958)
Stan Getz – Jazz Giants '58
Sarah Vaughan – Sarah Vaughan Sings Broadway: Great Songs from Hit Shows (1958)
Chet Baker – Chet (1959)
Barbara Cook – Barbara Cook Sings "From the Heart"  (1959)
Joni James – 100 Strings and Joni (1959)
Stan Getz – Cool Velvet: Stan Getz and Strings (1960)
Anita O'Day – Anita O'Day and Billy May Swing Rodgers and Hart (1960)
Chris Connor – Double Exposure with Maynard Ferguson (1961), Warm Cool: The Atlantic Years (2000)
June Christy – The Intimate Miss Christy (1963)
Rosemary Clooney – Love (1963)
Johnny Hartman – The Voice That Is!! (1964)
Jack Jones – Where Love Has Gone (1964)
Patty Waters – College Tour (1966)
Leontyne Price – Right as the Rain (1967
Oscar Peterson – Another Day (1972)
Jackie McLean with the Great Jazz Trio – New Wine in Old Bottles (1978)
Keith Jarrett Trio – Standards (1983)
Larry Coryell – Comin' Home (1984)
Linda Ronstadt with Nelson Riddle – Lush Life (1984)
George Shearing – Grand Piano (album) (1985)
Susannah McCorkle – Ballad Essentials (2002)
Beegie Adair – Centennial Composers Collection (2003)
Mark Murphy – Once to Every Heart (2005)
Hugh Masekela – Almost Like Being in Jazz (2005) 
Anthony Braxton Quartet – Standards (Brussels) 2006 (2008)
Chris Botti – Italia (2007)
Jeff Goldblum and the Mildred Snitzer Orchestra - The Capitol Studios Sessions (2018)
Steve Nelson- Brothers Under the Sun (2017)

Popular Culture 
The Miles Davis recording was used in the movies: Runaway Bride (1999)
Lenny Bruce biopic Lenny'' (1974).
Fargo season 04 end credits

References 

Songs with music by Richard Rodgers
Songs with lyrics by Lorenz Hart
Ella Fitzgerald songs
1940 songs
Songs from Rodgers and Hart musicals
1940s jazz standards